The 2019–20 Liga IV Dâmbovița was the 52nd season of the Liga IV Dâmbovița, the fourth tier of the Romanian football league system. The season began on 17 August 2019 and was scheduled to end in June 2020, but was suspended in March because of the COVID-19 pandemic in Romania.

AJF Dâmbovița (County Football Association) was intended to end the season with a play-off between the first three ranked teams, but only Roberto Ziduri announced that it can comply with the conditions imposed by the medical protocol and was declared county champion and representative of Dâmbovița County at the promotion play-off to Liga III.

Team changes

To Liga IV Dâmbovița
Relegated from Liga III
 —

Promoted from Liga V Dâmbovița
 Cetatea Târgoviste
 Gaz Metan Finta
 Urban Titu

From Liga IV Dâmbovița
Promoted to Liga III
 —

Relegated to Liga V Dâmbovița
 Viitorul I.L. Caragiale
 Petrolul Târgoviște
 Coada Izvorului

Other changes
 Unirea Răcari withdrew from Liga IV and was replaced by Steagu Roșu Colacu.
 Voința Perșinari was replaced by Viitorul Răzvad
 During the winter break, Cetatea Târgoviște 1396 was renamed as Străjerii Târgoviște 1396

League table

Promotion play-off

Champions of Liga IV – Dâmbovița County face champions of Liga IV – Argeș County and Liga IV – Dolj County.

Region 5 (South–West)

Group A

See also

Main Leagues
 2019–20 Liga I
 2019–20 Liga II
 2019–20 Liga III
 2019–20 Liga IV

County Leagues (Liga IV series)

 2019–20 Liga IV Alba
 2019–20 Liga IV Arad
 2019–20 Liga IV Argeș
 2019–20 Liga IV Bacău
 2019–20 Liga IV Bihor
 2019–20 Liga IV Bistrița-Năsăud
 2019–20 Liga IV Botoșani
 2019–20 Liga IV Brăila
 2019–20 Liga IV Brașov
 2019–20 Liga IV Bucharest
 2019–20 Liga IV Buzău
 2019–20 Liga IV Călărași
 2019–20 Liga IV Caraș-Severin
 2019–20 Liga IV Cluj
 2019–20 Liga IV Constanța
 2019–20 Liga IV Covasna
 2019–20 Liga IV Dolj
 2019–20 Liga IV Galați 
 2019–20 Liga IV Giurgiu
 2019–20 Liga IV Gorj
 2019–20 Liga IV Harghita
 2019–20 Liga IV Hunedoara
 2019–20 Liga IV Ialomița
 2019–20 Liga IV Iași
 2019–20 Liga IV Ilfov
 2019–20 Liga IV Maramureș
 2019–20 Liga IV Mehedinți
 2019–20 Liga IV Mureș
 2019–20 Liga IV Neamț
 2019–20 Liga IV Olt
 2019–20 Liga IV Prahova
 2019–20 Liga IV Sălaj
 2019–20 Liga IV Satu Mare
 2019–20 Liga IV Sibiu
 2019–20 Liga IV Suceava
 2019–20 Liga IV Teleorman
 2019–20 Liga IV Timiș
 2019–20 Liga IV Tulcea
 2019–20 Liga IV Vâlcea
 2019–20 Liga IV Vaslui
 2019–20 Liga IV Vrancea

References

External links
 Official website 

Liga IV seasons
Sport in Dâmbovița County